Autostichidae is a family of moths in the moth superfamily Gelechioidea.

Subfamilies
Autostichinae Le Marchand, 1947
Deocloninae Hodges, 1998
Glyphidocerinae Hodges, 1998
Holcopogoninae Gozmány, 1967
Oegoconiinae Leraut, 1992
Symmocinae Gozmány, 1957

References

Autostichidae at funet

 
Gelechioidea
Moth families